Tenieta is a moth genus in the family Autostichidae.

Species
 Tenieta albidella (Rebel, 1901)
 Tenieta evae Gozmány, 1967

References

Symmocinae